Wedge Island may refer to:

Australia
 Wedge Island (South Australia)
Wedge Island, South Australia, a locality
 Wedge Island (Tasmania)
 Wedge Island (Western Australia)

Canada
 Wedge Island (Nova Scotia)
 Wedge Island (Nunavut)